Trois-Rivières is a commune in the overseas department of Guadeloupe, and the chef-lieu of the Canton of Trois-Rivières. It is on the south coast of the island of Basse-Terre. It is surrounded with the towns of Capesterre-Belle-Eau, Vieux-Fort and Gourbeyre.

Population

Twin towns
It is twinned with La Ferté-Saint-Aubin, a town in Loiret, France.

Education
Public preschools and primary schools:
 Ecole primaire Bourg 1 Trois-Rivières
 Ecole primaire Bourg 2 Trois-Rivières
 Ecole primaire Grand-Anse
 Ecole primaire Schoelcher
 Ecole maternelle La Plaine
 Ecole Bourg 2 de Trois-Rivières

Public junior high schools include:
 Collège Les Roches gravées

See also
 List of lighthouses in Guadeloupe
 Communes of the Guadeloupe department

References

External links
 Tourist office of Trois-Rivières .

Communes of Guadeloupe
Lighthouses in Guadeloupe